The Hampton National Guard Armory is a history military facility at 504 North King Street in Hampton, Virginia.  A large brick building with Moderne styling, it was built in 1936 with funding support from the New Deal-era Works Progress Administration, and is one of the few surviving armories built in the inter-war period in coastal Virginia.  It originally housed Battery D of the 111th Field Artillery, and was used as a community meeting space for dances and other social events.

The building was listed on the National Register of Historic Places in 2016.

See also
National Register of Historic Places listings in Hampton, Virginia

References

Armories on the National Register of Historic Places in Virginia
Moderne architecture in Virginia
Buildings and structures completed in 1936
Buildings and structures in Hampton, Virginia
National Register of Historic Places in Hampton, Virginia